The 2013 NASCAR K&N Pro Series West was the 60th season of the K&N Pro Series West. It began with the Talking Stick Resort 60 at Phoenix International Raceway on March 2, and ended with the Casino Arizona 100, also at Phoenix, on November 8. Dylan Kwasniewski entered as the defending series champion, but didn't defend his title as he competed for the 2013 NASCAR K&N Pro Series East championship. Derek Thorn won his first championship after the last race, 6 points ahead of Cameron Hayley.

Drivers

Schedule 
The UNOH Battle at the Beach was an exhibition race and did not count towards the championship.

Results and standings

Races

Drivers' championship 

(key) Bold - Pole position awarded by time. Italics - Pole position set by final practice results or rainout. * – Most laps led.

See also

 2013 NASCAR Sprint Cup Series
 2013 NASCAR Nationwide Series
 2013 NASCAR Camping World Truck Series
 2013 ARCA Racing Series
 2013 NASCAR K&N Pro Series East
 2013 NASCAR Canadian Tire Series
 2013 NASCAR Toyota Series
 2013 NASCAR Whelen Euro Series

References 

ARCA Menards Series West
2013 in NASCAR